Amber Reed (born 3 April 1991) is an English rugby union player. She won the 2014 Women's Rugby World Cup as a member of 's squad and was selected for the 2017 Women's Rugby World Cup squad. She currently also plays for Bristol Bears.

International career 

Reed debuted for the England Women's rugby team in 2012 against France, having previously played for the national side's Under 20s team.

In 2014, she  won the Women's Rugby World Cup with England. Reed went on to play every match in the 2017 Six Nations, in which England won the Grand Slam. She was also selected for the England World Cup team in 2017; the side lost in the final to New Zealand.

A recurring back injury that kept her off the pitch for several months in 2018 and resulted in a specialist advising her to retire from contact sports. However, after her recovery and rehabilitation, Reed's international career continued at the 2018 Women's Six Nations. In 2019, Reed won her 50th cap playing in the Super Series in the USA and received the award from her mother. The same year, she was offered a full-time contract by the RFU, having previously juggled her rugby career with a teaching career. She also played in the first England Women versus the Barbarians match at Twickenham in 2019, which England won.

She again played for England in the curtailed 2020 Women's Six Nations.

Club career 
Reed began playing rugby at 14 when she attended Colston's School. While competing in the Rosslyn Park National Schools 7s, she was selected for the England pathway development track.

She played briefly for Thornbury RFC before joining the Bristol Bears women's team in 2009, where she continues to play.

Activism 
In 2021, Reed became an active member of the #icare social media campaign started by Bristol Bears teammate Stef Evans after Twitter users expressed derision and posted abusive tweets about the news that the 2021 Women's World Cup had been rescheduled.

She has spoken publicly about mental health in sports and is a spokesperson for 'Looseheadz’, a rugby clothing brand raising awareness for mental health.

Early life 
Reed is the niece of former Scottish International Andy Reed.

As a youth, she played cricket for Gloucestershire and hockey for Bristol. She attended Colston's School and went on to attain a degree in Exercise and Sports Science from the University of Exeter. She was named British University Colleges Sports Person of the Year in 2013.

As well as a professional rugby player, Reed is a qualified PE teacher and has taught at Colston's School and Bloxham School.

References

External links
 

1991 births
Living people
England women's international rugby union players
English female rugby union players
Schoolteachers from Oxfordshire
Female rugby union players
Rugby union players from Bristol
Schoolteachers from Bristol